The protected areas of Equatorial Guinea include national parks, scientific reserves, natural monuments, and nature reserves. As of June 2020, protected areas covered 5,228 km², or 19% of the country's land area.

National parks
(IUCN protected area category II)
 Pico Basilé National Park (330 km²)
 Monte Alén National Park (2000 km²)
 Altos de Nsork National Park (700 km²)

Scientific reserves
(IUCN protected area category 1b)
 Playa Nendyi Scientific Reserve (5 km²)
 Luba Crater Scientific Reserve (510 km²)

Natural monuments
(IUCN protected area category III)
 Piedra Bere Natural Monument (200 km²)
 Piedra Nzas Natural Monument (190 km²)

Nature reserves
(IUCN protected area category IV)
 Annobón Nature Reserve (230 km²)
 Rio Campo Nature Reserve (330 km²)
 Punta Llende Nature Reserve (55 km²)
 Corisco and Elobeyes Nature Reserve (480 km²)
 Monte Temelón Nature Reserve (230 km²)
 Muni Estuary Nature Reserve (600 km²)

Internationally-designated areas

Ramsar sites, wetlands of international importance
 Annobón Island (230 km²)
 Río Ntem o Campo (330 km²)
 Muni Estuary Nature Reserve (800 km²)

References

 
Equatorial Guinea
protected areas